Robion is a commune in the Vaucluse department in the Provence-Alpes-Côte d'Azur region in southeastern France. The new part of the village runs along the D2 road, and the old part of the village is clustered at the foot of the Luberon mountain.

Geography
The Calavon, locally called Coulon, flows westward through the middle of the commune.

See also
 Côtes du Luberon AOC
Communes of the Vaucluse department
Luberon

References

Communes of Vaucluse